Quelli dell'intervallo in vacanza is an Italian sitcom.

See also
List of Italian television series

Italian comedy television series